Ells is a surname. Notable people with the surname include:

 Glenn Ells (born 1934), Canadian politician
 Roy Ells (1914–1979), Canadian politician
 Steve Ells (born 1966), American businessman

See also
 Els (given name)
 Wells (name)